The Ministry of Defence of Brazil is the civilian cabinet organization responsible for managing the Military of Brazil. It is Brazil's ministry of defence. It is headed by the Minister of Defence.

The Ministry of Defence has three major components under its command structure – the Army Command, the Navy Command, and the Air Force Command. Among the many agencies operated by the Ministry of Defence are the National Civil Aviation Agency, the Infraero, and the Superior War School. The ministry is headquartered in the Ministries Esplanade section of the Monumental Axis, Brasília.

Defence policy
Brazil's national defence policy is outlined in the National Defence Policy, the National Mobilization Policy and the National Defence Strategy.

List of Ministers of Defence

See also

 National Defence Council
 Federal institutions of Brazil
 Joint Staff of the Armed Forces

Notes and references 
4. http://www.aereo.jor.br/2017/01/12/2017-orcamento-da-defesa-do-brasil/

External links
 Ministry of Defense 
 Brazilian Army 
 Brazilian Navy 
 Brazilian Air Force 
 National Civil Aviation Agency 
 Superior War College 

 
Defence agencies of Brazil
Brazil
Defence
Defence
Brazil, Defence
1999 establishments in Brazil